There have been two baronetcies created for persons with the surname Carden, one in the Baronetage of Ireland and one in the Baronetage of the United Kingdom. Both creations are extant as of 2010.

The Carden Baronetcy, of Templemore in the County of Tipperary, was created in the Baronetage of Ireland on 31 August 1787 for John Carden, commander of the 30th Regiment of Light Dragoons, which he had helped raise. His son from his third marriage, the third Baronet (who succeeded his half-brother), fought at the Battle of Waterloo in 1815. The sixth Baronet, Sir John Valentine Carden was a notable tank and vehicle designer. The family was originally from Cheshire, England, but settled at Templemore in County Tipperary around 1650. Admiral John Surman Carden was a member of another branch of this family. The family seat was Templemore Abbey, built 1819 by architect William Vitruvius Morrison in the Tudor-Gothic style, extended in the 1860s, vacated in 1902, burnt in 1921, and demolished c1925. The family previously lived in the Butler Castle, accidentally destroyed by a fire in 1740, with the ruins now known as The Black Castle.

The Carden Baronetcy, of Wimpole Street in the County of Middlesex and of Molesey in the County of Surrey, was created in the Baronetage of the United Kingdom on 14 June 1887 for Robert Carden. He was Lord Mayor of London from 1857 to 1858 and also represented Gloucester and Barnstaple in the House of Commons. He was succeeded by his eldest son, the second Baronet. He was a Lieutenant-Colonel in the 5th Lancers and served as High Sheriff of Hampshire in 1891. His eldest son, the third Baronet, was a Major in the 1st Life Guards and also served as High Sheriff of Hampshire in 1922 and as a Deputy Lieutenant of Berkshire in 1936. He was succeeded by his son, the fourth Baronet. He was a Lieutenant-Colonel in the 17th/21st Lancers.

Carden baronets, of Templemore (1787)

Sir John Craven Carden, 1st Baronet (–1820)
Sir Arthur Carden, 2nd Baronet (1778–1822)
Sir Henry Robert Carden, 3rd Baronet (1789–1847)
Sir John Craven Carden, 4th Baronet (1819–1879)
Sir John Craven Carden, 5th Baronet (1854–1931)
Sir John Valentine Carden, 6th Baronet (1892–1935)
Sir John Craven Carden, 7th Baronet (1926–2008)
Sir John Craven Carden, 8th Baronet (1953–2021)
Sir Patrick John Cameron Carden, 9th Baronet (born 1988)

Carden baronets, of Wimpole Street and Molesey (1887)
Sir Robert Walter Carden, 1st Baronet (1801–1888)
Sir Frederick Walter Carden, 2nd Baronet (1833–1909)
Sir Frederick Henry Walter Carden, 3rd Baronet (1873–1966)
Sir Henry Christopher Carden, 4th Baronet (1908–1993)
Sir Christopher Robert Carden, 5th Baronet (born 1946)

References

Kidd, Charles, Williamson, David (editors). Debrett's Peerage and Baronetage (1990 edition). New York: St Martin's Press, 1990.

Carden
1787 establishments in Ireland
1887 establishments in the United Kingdom
Templemore
Baronetcies in the Baronetage of the United Kingdom